Jade Rasif (born 21 January 1994) is a Singaporean DJ, YouTube personality and former actress.

Background
Jade Rasif was born in Singapore on 21 January 1994 and is the eldest of three sisters. She is noted to be the daughter of the fugitive lawyer, David Rasif who ran off with S$11.3 million of his clients' money in 2006. She was placed as first runner-up in New Paper New Face 2013. She is also known for playing Sheila Oh on Tanglin, from seasons 1 to 3.

Rasif has performed in Singapore, Thailand, and Malaysia and is currently the highest paid DJ in Singapore as of 2017.

Rasif graduated with a degree in Psychology from the Faculty of Arts and Social Sciences, National University of Singapore.

Personal life
In early November 2018, Rasif revealed she was about seven and a half months pregnant, which she reportedly conceived with her unknown boyfriend in a Bentley car parked at Beauty World carpark. In the Real Talk YouTube video which was posted on December 30, it was revealed that she gave birth to a boy in the mid December 2018. At the end of the video, she had her three other co-hosts, Dew, John and Saffron try out her breast milk which she had pumped out earlier while on her way to work.

Filmography

Television dramas

References

1994 births
Living people
Singaporean actresses
Singaporean people of Chinese descent
Singaporean DJs
Singaporean people of Indian descent
Singaporean female models